The 2004 Italian Figure Skating Championships was held in Milan from January 15 through 17, 2004. Skaters competed in the disciplines of men's singles, ladies' singles, and ice dancing. The results were used to choose the teams to the 2004 World Championships, the 2004 European Championships, and the 2004 World Junior Championships.

Senior results

Men

Ladies

Ice dancing

External links
 results

Italian Figure Skating Championships
2003 in figure skating
Italian Figure Skating Championships, 2004
2004 in Italian sport